Allersee is a lake in Wolfsburg, Lower Saxony, Germany. At an elevation of 57 m, its surface area is 0.29 km2.

References 
The Aller Lake developed during a diversion of the Aller in 1969 and was made deeper in 1987. The lake lies between the Mittellandkanal and the Aller. It is 1230 metre long, 270 metre wide and has a volume of approx 1 Mio. m³.

The Aller Lake is mainly for swimming with very attractive beaches.
It's also brilliant for water sports like canoeing, rowing and sailing. To use the lake for boating requires a license.

Lakes of Lower Saxony